Sakari Suzuki (10 October 1899 – January 1995) was an American artist born in Japan.

Description
Suzuki was born in Iwate, Japan. He moved to San Francisco in 1918 to join his father. Sukuzi attended California School of Fine Arts there in 1924. From 1932 until 1936 he exhibited in New York. In 1936 he worked for the Federal Art Project creating murals at the Willard Parker Hospital, which is now demolished.

Suzuki moved to Chicago, Illinois in about 1951  and died in January 1995.

References

1899 births
1995 deaths
People from Iwate Prefecture
Japanese emigrants to the United States
American artists of Japanese descent
Federal Art Project artists
20th-century American painters
American male painters
20th-century American male artists